Ryder Bateman (born February 18, 1980 in Calgary, Alberta) was a professional lacrosse player. He played for the Portland LumberJax of the National Lacrosse League and the Victoria Shamrocks of the Western Lacrosse Association. In 2005 Bateman made his debut in the NLL, playing for the Minnesota Swarm. Bateman finished the season tied for second among rookies in goals (20), and third in scoring (39 pts). He made te All Rookie team. In 2006, Bateman was traded to the Portland LumberJax roster mid season, where he helped the expansion franchise clinch the regular season Western Division Title. He played college lacrosse for the Whittier College Poets in Los Angeles.

Statistics

NLL
Reference:

References

1980 births
Living people
Canadian lacrosse players
Canadian people of British descent
Canadian people of German descent
Minnesota Swarm players
Portland LumberJax players
Sportspeople from Calgary
Whittier College alumni